U.C. Sampdoria had its most successful season ever, winning the Coppa Italia and reaching the final of the Cup Winners' Cup, where it came up short to Barcelona with 2–0. It finished fifth in Serie A with 14 goals from Gianluca Vialli marking the international breakthrough for the striker.

Squad

Goalkeepers
  Gianluca Pagliuca
  Guido Bistazzoni

Defenders
  Moreno Mannini
  Pietro Vierchowod
  Luca Pellegrini
  Marco Lanna
  Amedeo Carboni
  Stefano Pellegrini
  Emilio Affuso

Midfielders
  Fulvio Bonomi
  Fausto Pari
  Mirco Gubellini
  Toninho Cerezo
  Fausto Salsano
  Víctor Muñoz
  Giuseppe Dossena
  Roberto Breda

Attackers
  Enrico Chiesa
  Roberto Mancini
  Gianluca Vialli
  Loris Pradella

Competitions

Serie A

League table

Matches

Topscorers
  Gianluca Vialli 14
  Roberto Mancini 9
  Giuseppe Dossena 5

Coppa Italia

First round

Second round

Quarterfinals

Semifinals

Final

Supercoppa

European Cup Winners' Cup

First round

Second round

Quarterfinals

Semifinals

Final

References

Sources
RSSSF - Italy 1988/89

U.C. Sampdoria seasons
Sampdoria